Blowatz is a municipality in the Nordwestmecklenburg district, in Mecklenburg-Vorpommern, Germany.

References

Municipalities in Mecklenburg-Western Pomerania
Nordwestmecklenburg